Talkhestan may refer to:
 Talkhestan, Kermanshah
 Talkhestan, Markazi